Comanche County is a county located in the U.S. state of Oklahoma. As of the 2010 census, the population was 124,098, making it the fourth-most populous county in Oklahoma. Its county seat is Lawton. The county was created in 1901 as part of Oklahoma Territory. It was named for the Comanche tribal nation.

Comanche County is included in the Lawton, OK Metropolitan Statistical Area.

Built on former reservation lands of the Comanche, Kiowa, and Apache in Indian Territory, Comanche County was open for settlement on August 16, 1901, by lottery. The region has three cities and seven towns as well as the Fort Sill military installation and Wichita Mountains Wildlife Refuge. The landscape of the county is typical of the Great Plains with flat topography and gently rolling hills, while the areas in the north are marked by the Wichita Mountains. Interstate 44 and three major US Highways serve the county by ground, while the Lawton-Fort Sill Regional Airport serves the county by air.

Comanche County's economy is largely based in the government sector which consist of half of the county's gross domestic product. The governance of the county is led by a three commission board, which are elected in four year staggered terms. The county is served by several school districts and Cameron University in education as well as three hospitals for health care.

History

The land that is present day Oklahoma was first settled by prehistoric American Indians including the Clovis 11500 BCE, Folsom 10600 BCE and Plainview 10000 BCE cultures. Western explorers came to the region in the 16th century with Spanish explorer Francisco Vásquez de Coronado visiting in 1541. Most of the region during this time was settled by the Wichita and Caddo people. Around the 1700s, two tribes from the North, the Comanches and Kiowas, migrated to the Oklahoma and Texas region.

For most of the 18th century, the Oklahoma region was under French control as Louisiana. In 1803, the Louisiana Purchase by Thomas Jefferson brought the area under United States control. In 1830, Congress passed the Indian Removal Act, which removed American Indian tribes and relocated them to Indian Territory. The southern part of the territory was originally assigned to the Choctaw and Chickasaw until 1867 when the Medicine Lodge Treaty allotted the southwest portion of the Choctaw and Chickasaw's lands to the Comanche, Kiowa, and Apache tribes.

Fort Sill was established in 1869 by Major General Philip Sheridan who was leading a campaign in Indian Territory to stop raids into Texas by American Indian tribes. In 1874, the Red River War broke out in the region when the Comanche, Kiowa and Southern Cheyenne left their Indian Territory reservation. Attrition and skirmishes by the US Army finally forced the return of the tribes back to Indian Territory in June 1875.

In 1891, the United States Congress appointed a commission to meet with the tribal leaders and come to an agreement allowing white settlement in the region.

Three  sites in Kiowa, Caddo and Comanche Counties were selected for county seats with Lawton designated as the Comanche County seat. Non-Indian settlement was opened through an auction of lots beginning on August 6, 1901. In December 1906, the south regions of the county reserved for grazing land reserved for American Indian livestock, Big Pasture, were open for settlement.

In 1910, the western portion of Comanche County and southern part of Kiowa County were used to create the short lived county of Swanson. After a lawsuit brought by Comanche County, Swanson County was dissolved by the Supreme Court on June 27, 1911. In 1912, the southern portion of Comanche County, which at the time extended to the Red River, were used to create the new county of Cotton County.

Geography

Comanche County lies in an area that is typical of the Great Plains with prairie, few trees, and generally flat topography with gently rolling hills. The north region of the county consists of the Wichita Mountains including Mount Scott and Mount Pinchot the area's highest peaks.

The area consists mostly of Permian Post Oak Conglomerate limestone on the northern sections of the county. In the south sections of the county, Permian Garber Sandstone is commonly found with some Hennessey Group shale. Area creeks including East Cache Creek and West Cache Creek contain deposits of Quaternary alluvium. To the northwest, the Wichita Mountains consist primarily of Wichita Granite Group from the Cambrian Period.

There are three cities in Comanche County. The largest, Lawton is located in the center of the county and is the county seat. According to the US census, the population of Lawton was 96,867 in 2010, which is 78 percent of the county's population. Cache is located to the west of Lawton on US Highway 62 and has a population of 2,796. In the northeast, Elgin is located along Interstate 44 and has a population of 2,156. Several towns dot the county including: Fletcher, Sterling in the northeast, Medicine Park in the north central region, Indiahoma in the west, Geronimo in the southeast, and Chattanooga and Faxon in the southern regions of the county. Also located in Comanche County is Fort Sill. The 90,000 acre instillation is home to the US Army Field Artillery Training Center and the Air Defense Artillery.

Protected areas in Comanche County include the 59,020 acre Wichita Mountains Wildlife Refuge. Established in 1901 the refuge is one of the 546 wildlife refuges throughout the United States to provide a natural habitat for native grazing animals like the Bison, Elk, and Texas longhorn cattle.

Adjacent counties
 Kiowa County (northwest)
 Tillman County (southwest)
 Cotton County (south)
 Stephens County (southeast)
 Grady County (northeast)
 Caddo County (north)

Climate
Comanche County lies in a dry subtropical climate (Köppen climate classification Cfa), with frequent variations in weather daily, except during the constantly hot and dry summer months. Frequent strong winds, usually from the south or south-southeast during the summer, help to lessen the hotter weather. Northerly winds during the winter can occasionally intensify cold periods.

The summers can be extremely hot with an average 21 days with temperatures  and above. The winter months are typically mild, though there can be periods of extreme cold. The area averages eight days per year that fail to rise above freezing.

Typically in late April through early June, Comanche County is prone to severe weather which can include tornadoes. Notably in 1957, an F4 tornado and again in 1979 an F3 tornado struck the southern region of Lawton.

Demographics

As of the census of 2010, there were 124,098 people, 44,982 households, and 30,303 families residing in the county.  The population density was 116 people per square mile (45/km2).  There were 50,739 housing units at an average density of 47 per square mile (18/km2).  The racial makeup of the county was 64.5% White, 17.5% Black or African American, 5.9% Native American, 2.2% Asian, 0.6% Pacific Islander, 3.0% from other races, and 6.5% from two or more races.  11.2% of the population were Hispanic or Latino of any race (7.0% Mexican, 2.4% Puerto Rican, 0.3% Spanish, 0.2% Panamanian).

There were 44,982 households, out of which 36.5% had children under the age of 18 living with them, 48.2% were married couples living together, 14.5% had a female householder with no husband present, and 32.6% were non-families. 27.1% of all households were made up of individuals, and 7.8% had someone living alone who was 65 years of age or older.  The average household size was 2.53 and the average family size was 3.07.

In the county, the population was spread out, with 25.1% under the age of 18, 13.6% from 18 to 24, 30.1% from 25 to 44, 23.3% from 45 to 64, and 10.2% who were 65 years of age or older.  The median age was 31.3 years. For every 100 females there were 106.2 males.  For every 100 females age 18 and over, there were 107.3 males.

The median income for a household in the county was $43,817, and the median income for a family was $51,564. Males had a median income of $37,423 versus $31,913 for females. The per capita income for the county was $21,048.  About 14.3% of families and 17.6% of the population were below the poverty line, including 29.4% of those under age 18 and 8.1% of those age 65 or over.

Politics

Law and government

Comanche County has a county commission comprising three members elected by district. Commissioners from each district serve four-year staggered terms in partisan elections. Boundaries are set once every 10 years following the federal census. The Board is responsible for inspecting and approving county programs and facilities, supervise the performance county officials, maintaining the county infrastructure, as well as overseeing the financial affairs of the county. In 2011, the commissioners were District 1 Gail Turner, District 2 Ron Kirby, and District 3 Don Hawthorne. In addition to the county commissioners, other elected county officials include: District Attorney, County Sheriff, Treasurer, Assessor, County Clerk, and Court clerk.

At the federal level, Lawton lies in Oklahoma 4th Congressional district, represented by Tom Cole. In the State Senate, the county is represented by District 31 (Don Barrington) and 32 (Randy Bass). In the House, District 50 (Dennis Johnson), 62 (T.W. Shannon), 63 (Don Armes), 64 (Ann Coody), 65 (Joe Dorman) covers the county.

Economy
Comanche County's economy is primarily centered on government, manufacturing and retail trade industries. The Lawton MSA has a Gross Domestic Product of $4.89 Billion in 2010 with half (2.66 Billion) in the Government sector. Private industries accounted for 2.23 Billion in GDP in which Manufacturing (451 Million), Real estate and rental and leasing (305 Million), and Retail Trade (255 Million) were the largest fields. In May 2010, it was estimated there were 41,720 people employed. The largest occupation fields included, the Office and Administrative Support Occupations field which had 6,760 employed, the Food Preparation and Serving Related Occupations which employed 4,630, and the Sales and Related Occupations which had 4,150 employed.

Media
The Lawton Constitution is the only daily newspaper published in the county and has a circulation of 30,000. In addition the Fort Sill newspaper, The Cannoneer, is published weekly primarily for military personnel as well as the newspaper The Cameron Collegian  whose main audience is Cameron University students. Additionally, Okie Magazine is a monthly magazine that focuses on news and entertainment in the Southwest Oklahoma area. Fletcher News publishes online news of northeastern Comanche County, including Fletcher, Elgin and Sterling, at http://www.fletcher-news.com.html.

Radio stations in Lawton include, two AM Stations KXCA 1050 and KKRX 1380 as well as several FM stations including, NPR affiliate KCCU 89.3, KZCD 94.1, KMGZ 95.3, KJMZ 97.9, KBZQ 99.5, KLAW 101.3 and KVRW 107.3

Comanche County is located in the Wichita Falls and Lawton Media Market which encompasses 154,450 households with a television, making it the 149th largest in the nation according to Nelson Media Research in 2009–2010. KSWO-TV channel 7, an ABC affiliate, is the only broadcast television station in the area that provides local news. All other major stations including, KFDX-TV 3 (NBC), KAUZ-TV (CBS), and KJTL-TV (Fox) are based in Wichita Falls.

Transportation
Comanche County is primarily served by Interstate 44, designated as the H. E. Bailey Turnpike. It connects the county to Oklahoma City to the northeast and to Wichita Falls, Texas to the south. The county is also connected by US Highway 62, which connects to the regional towns of Altus to the west and Anadarko to the north. Other major thoroughfares include US Highway 277 and 281, which parallels the H. E. Bailey Turnpike to Wichita Falls to the south and leads to regional towns of Anadarko and Chickasha, respectively, to the north.

Several State Highways cross the county including, State Highway 7 which connects Lawton to Duncan. State Highway 17 starts at US Highway 62 and connects the city of Elgin to the town of Sterling and leads to Rush Springs in Grady County. State Highway 36 connects the towns of Chattanooga to Faxon and has its eastern terminus at Interstate 44. State Highway 49 enters the county from Kiowa County and becomes unsigned through the Wichita Wildlife refuge heading east. Leaving the refuge it becomes signed and leads through Medicine Park to its eastern terminus at Interstate 44. State Highway 58 connects to Carnegie in Caddo County to State Highway 49 near Medicine Park. State Highway 115 leads from Mountain View in Kiowa County through Meers to the Wichita Mountain Refuge. There it becomes unsigned as it leads to the south. Exiting the refuge, it becomes signed and leads to its southern terminus north of Cache on US Highway 62.

Lawton Area Transit System (LATS) provides public transit locally for Lawton and Fort Sill. LATS main terminal is located near the Lawton Public Library and provides five major routes throughout the city.

By air, Comanche County is served by the Lawton-Fort Sill Regional Airport (LAW, KLAW). At present, it offers daily American Eagle flights to Dallas/Fort Worth International Airport and is also used for military transport.

Education and healthcare
The county has ten independent school districts. The largest is Lawton Public Schools which had 16,398 in 2009. The district operates two pre-kindergarten centers, twenty-six elementary schools, four middle schools, and three high schools – Eisenhower, Lawton, and MacArthur. Other major school districts in the area include Cache Public Schools and Elgin Public Schools. Cache Public Schools had an enrollment of 1,648 and consists of five schools. Elgin Public Schools had an enrollment of 16,98 and three schools. Other public school districts in the region include, Bishop Chattanooga, Fletcher, Flower Mound, Geronimo, Indiahoma, and Sterling.

Comanche County includes several private schools. The largest is Lawton Christian School with an enrollment of 426 students in 2009. Lawton Academy of Arts & Science offers classes from PK-12 and had an enrollment of 115. St. Mary's Catholic School offers classes for elementary and middle school. Trinity Christian Academy offers classes from K-3 through the 8th grade.

There is one university in Comanche County, Cameron University. Cameron is the largest four year, state-funded university, in southwest Oklahoma, offering more than 50 degree programs in areas of Business, Education, Liberal Arts and Science and Technology. Founded in 1909, Cameron has an average fall enrollment of 6,000 students with 70 endowed faculty positions.

Comanche County is also served by the Great Plains Technology Center, which is part of the Oklahoma Department of Career and Technology Education System. Great Plains provides occupational education, training, and development opportunities to area residents.

Comanche County has three major hospitals in the area. The largest, Comanche County Memorial Hospital, is a 283-bed non-profit hospital that employs 250 physicians. Southwestern Medical Center is a 199-bed hospital with a staff of 150 physicians. In addition, the U.S. Public Health Lawton Indian Hospital is located in the city to provide health services for the large American Indian population. It has 26 beds with a staff of 23 physicians.

Communities

Cities
 Cache
 Elgin
 Lawton (county seat)

Towns
 Chattanooga
 Faxon
 Fletcher
 Geronimo
 Indiahoma
 Medicine Park
 Sterling

Census-designated places
 Edgewater Park
 Lake Ellsworth Addition
 Lakeside Village
 Lawtonka Acres

Other unincorporated communities
 Bethel
 Meers
 Pumpkin Center

Notable people
Notable residents include country singers: Bryan White, Kelly Willis, and Leon Russell, Grammy nominated jazz trombonist Conrad Herwig, and Flaming Lips drummer Steven Drozd. Notable authors include Pulitzer Prize winning author  N. Scott Momaday, poet Don Blanding, and Hugo Award winner, C. J. Cherryh.

Politicians from Comanche County include: U.S. Senator Thomas Gore, US Representatives: Scott Ferris, L. M. Gensman, Toby Morris, and Elmer Thomas. Other politicians include Democratic State Senator Randy Bass and former U.S. Ambassador to Czechoslovakia Julian Niemczyk.

Other notable residents include: World War II Comanche Code Talker Charles Chibitty, World War II Nurse and POW Col. Rosemary Hogan, Academy Award winning actress Joan Crawford, World War II ace Robert S. Johnson, three time NBA champion Stacey King, former NBA All-Star Michael Ray Richardson,  Miss America 2007 Lauren Nelson, infamous University of Oklahoma quarterback Charles Thompson, NFL Pro Bowlers Will Shields and Jammal Brown

Quanah Parker built his final residence in the town of Cache, Comanche County.

See also
 National Register of Historic Places listings in Comanche County, Oklahoma

References

External links

 Comanche County
 City of Lawton
 Fort Sill Military Reservation 
 Encyclopedia of Oklahoma History and Culture - Comanche County
 Oklahoma Digital Maps: Digital Collections of Oklahoma and Indian Territory

 
1901 establishments in Oklahoma Territory
Populated places established in 1901